Cupidstown Hill, at , is the highest point in County Kildare, Ireland, and lies on the fringes of the Wicklow Mountains,  east of Naas.

Naming

The origin of the name is uncertain; "Cupid" may have originally been Cuthbert, Cudlipp or coppis.

Geography 
At 379 metres it is the highest summit in Kildare, almost twice as high as the Hill of Allen. But Cupidstown Hill is lesser known than other summits in Kildare as it is dwarfed by nearby mountains such as Kippure. It is just above the village of Kilteel, and is the 872nd highest summit in Ireland.

See also 
Lists of mountains in Ireland
List of Irish counties by highest point
List of mountains of the British Isles by height
List of Marilyns in the British Isles

References 

Mountains and hills of County Kildare
Highest points of Irish counties